The Tour International de Sétif is a cycling race held annually since 2014 in Algeria. It is part of UCI Africa Tour and is rated a 2.2 event.

Winners

References

Cycle races in Algeria
2014 establishments in Algeria
Recurring sporting events established in 2014
UCI Africa Tour races